Acklen is a surname. Notable people with the surname include:

Adelicia Acklen (1817–1887), American planter and socialite
Joseph Alexander Smith Acklen (1816–1863), American lawyer, planter, and veteran
Joseph H. Acklen (1850–1938), American sugar planter and politician

See also
Ackley (surname)